Jagdish Narain Mandal (1917-2002) was an Indian politician. He was elected to the Lok Sabha, lower house of the Parliament of India from Godda, Bihar as a member of the Indian National Congress.

References

External links
 Official biographical sketch in Parliament of India website

Indian National Congress politicians
India MPs 1971–1977
1917 births
Lok Sabha members from Bihar
2002 deaths